Chahe Subdistrict is a subdistrict in Hanjiang District, Yangzhou, Jiangsu, China.

History 
Chahe Subdistrict was upgraded to a subdistrict from a town in April 2003.

Geography 
Chahe Subdistrict has  of arable land, accounting for about 50% of its total area.

Administrative divisions 
As of 2021, Chahe Subdistrict administers the following three residential communities and nine administrative villages: 
Xuzhuang Community
Xibalipu Community
Gaoqiao Community
Xuji Village
Huzhuang Village
Xuelou Village
Dongqing Village
Yunxi Village
Mingxing Village
Jiangzhuang Village
Dongshi Village
Jianhua Village

Economy 
As of 2006, Chahe Subdistrict's gross domestic product totaled 1.092 billion renminbi, up 19.67% from the previous year.

Education 
Yangzhou University's Guangling College is located in Chahe Subdistrict.

Transportation 
National Highway 328 runs through the north of the subdistrict. The , which connects Nanjing and Nantong, also runs through the subdistrict. Other major roads in the subdistrict include Yangzijiang Road, and Runyang South Road.

See also 
 List of township-level divisions of Jiangsu
Runyang Yangtze River Bridge
Yangzhou University

References 

Township-level divisions of Jiangsu
Hanjiang District, Yangzhou